Greg Bruckner (born September 22, 1959) is an American professional golfer.

Bruckner was born in Manhattan Beach, California. He played college golf at Arizona State University and turned professional in 1986.

Bruckner played on the Asia Golf Circuit, winning the 1988 Singapore Open, before earning his PGA Tour card in 1989 at Q School. Bruckner played on the PGA Tour from 1990 to 1992 where his best finishes were a pair of T-14, at the 1990 H.E.B. Texas Open and the 1991 Northern Telecom Open. He played on the Nationwide Tour from 1992 to 1999 and again in 2004, winning once at the 1992 Ben Hogan New England Classic. He also played on the Gateway Tour from 2008 to 2010, winning once in 2009.

Amateur wins
1985 Pacific Coast Amateur

Professional wins (6)

Ben Hogan Tour wins (1)

Ben Hogan Tour playoff record (1–0)

Asia Golf Circuit wins (1)

Other wins (4)
1988 Rolex Masters
2003 Arizona Open
2009 Desert Winter #6 (Gateway Tour)
2015 Long Beach Open

See also
1989 PGA Tour Qualifying School graduates
1990 PGA Tour Qualifying School graduates

References

External links

American male golfers
Arizona State Sun Devils men's golfers
PGA Tour golfers
PGA Tour Champions golfers
Golfers from California
Golfers from Phoenix, Arizona
Sportspeople from Manhattan Beach, California
1959 births
Living people